Wood River Junction is a small village in the town of Richmond, Rhode Island, Washington County, Rhode Island, in the United States. It is home to the Chariho school district's main campus and is otherwise largely turf farms.

Geography
Wood River Junction is commonly considered by locals to be one of the coldest locations in the state of Rhode Island, due to its low-lying and flat geography. It is the home of Meadowbrook Pond, also known as Wood River Pond, a popular fishing area. It is surrounded by two rivers: the Wood River and Pawcatuck River.

History

Overview
The village was the site of Wood River Junction station, originally known as Richmond Switch. The Wood River Branch Railroad was chartered in 1872 and completed in 1874. The name was changed in April 1874. The six-mile branch line was built to provide service from the Hope Valley to the main line of the New York, Providence and Boston Railroad and was only six miles long. The New York, New Haven and Hartford Railroad took over operation of the Branch in 1892 and eventually abandoned it on August 8, 1947. The main line continues in operation today as Amtrak's Northeast Corridor.

Criticality accident
On 24 July 1964, a fatal criticality accident occurred at the United Nuclear Corporation Wood River Junction nuclear facility. This facility was designed to recover highly enriched uranium in scrap material from fuel element production. Technician Robert Peabody was working with a tank containing radioactive uranium-235 in a sodium carbonate solution, which was being agitated by a stirrer.

This criticality exposed the 37-year-old Peabody to a fatal radiation dose of "more than 700 rem", which is 7 Sv. He died 49 hours after the incident.

Ninety minutes later a second excursion happened when a plant manager returned to the building and turned off the agitator, exposing himself and another administrator to doses of up to 100 rad (1 Gy) without apparent ill effect. 

Members of the local Hope Valley Ambulance Squad (HVAS) responded to render aid, initially transporting the patient to Westerly Hospital; the hospital was not equipped for such a patient, the ambulance was turned away and the ambulance transported the patient to Rhode Island Hospital in Providence.

Although commonly referred to as taking place in Wood River Junction, the incident actually occurred just across the river in Charlestown.

See also

References

External links
 UNC Recovery Systems - Nuclear Incident at United Nuclear Corporation (8/24/1964)
 UNC Recovery Systems - Compliance Investigation Report Volume 1 - Report Details (9/16/1964)
 UNC Recovery Systems - Compliance Investigation Report Volume 3 - Supplemental Report with Exhibits (9/16/1964)

Villages in Rhode Island
Villages in Washington County, Rhode Island
Nuclear history of the United States